Maya Blagoeva (later Mitova, ; born 25 July 1956) is a retired Bulgarian artistic gymnast. A seven-time national champion, she competed at the 1972 Summer Olympics . 

Blagoeva has a bachelor's degree in physical education. She is married to the Olympic gymnastics coach Zarko Mitov and has a long coaching experience herself. She brought three gymnasts to the international and Olympic level, including her daughter Silvia Mitova. In the 1990s her family moved to the United States, where she works at the Silvia’s Gymnastics gym in Pennsylvania, together with her husband, daughter and son-in-law.

References

1956 births
Living people
Gymnasts at the 1972 Summer Olympics
Olympic gymnasts of Bulgaria
Bulgarian female artistic gymnasts